Manetta is a surname and given name. Notable people with this name include:

Surname:
Manuel Manetta, "Fess" Manetta (1889–1969), American jazz multi-instrumentalist
Manuela Manetta (born 1983), professional squash player who represented Italy
Marco Manetta (born 1991), Italian professional footballer

Given name:
Manetta Darnall or Linda Darnell (1923–1965), American actress

See also
Edgemoor and Manetta Railway, South Carolina shortline railroad
Manette (disambiguation)
Manetti